is a village located in Yoshino District, Nara Prefecture, Japan.

As of October 1, 2016, the village has an estimated population of 486. The total area is 274.05 km2.

The village has an aging population. Between 2002 and 2007 the population declined by 15.6%. This trend has continued. It is one of the villages expected to be extinct by 2040.

Geography

Neighboring municipalities
 Nara Prefecture
 Shimokitayama
 Gojō
 Totsukawa
 Kawakami
 Tenkawa
 Mie Prefecture
 Kumano
 Owase
 Ōdai
 Kihoku

Climate
Kamikitayama has a humid subtropical climate (Köppen climate classification Cfa) with hot summers and cool to cold winters. Precipitation is significantly higher in summer than in winter, though on the whole lower than most parts of Honshū, and there is no significant snowfall.

Demographics
Per Japanese census data, the population of Kamikitayama in 2020 is 444 people. Kamikitayama has been conducting censuses since 1920.

Education
Primary Schools
Kamikitayama Elementary School
Junior High Schools
Kamikitayama Junior High School

As of 2012 the two schools have a combined student population of 27. Even with such a small student body, in 2009 the village began employing an ALT(Assistant Language Teacher) of English from the JET Programme to live and work in village.

Notable places
 Yoshino-Kumano National Park
 Mount Ōdaigahara
 Sakamoto Dam
 Higashinokawa Post Office

References

External links

 Kamikitayama official website 

Villages in Nara Prefecture